Salvador Antonio Mariona Rivera (born 27 December 1943) is a Salvadoran former footballer who played as a defender. At international level, he represented his country at the 1970 FIFA World Cup in Mexico.

Club career
Born in Santa Tecla, Mariona moved with his parents to Izalco while still a boy and started a youth swimming career there, in the end winning a silver medal in a 4x100 m relief competition in Puerto Rico. He then began his footballing career at Mario Calvo in the third division and moved up to the Primera División de Fútbol de El Salvador when he joined Atlante.

But he spent the major part of his career at Salvadoran giants Alianza and also played for Platense Zacatecoluca, after which he retired in 1977 and became a coach.

International career
Nicknamed Chamba, he was selected to represent El Salvador for ten years and featured in qualifying and playing in the 1970 World Cup.

Retirement
After football, Salvador Mariona worked as an insurance salesman and gained enough experience to found Desarrollo, SA which quickly became AIG Unión y Desarrollo, SA.
Mariona was the Chief Executive of his beloved Alianza after taking over in 2005.

Personal life
Mariona is married to Floridalma Palacios and the couple have 5 children, one of them being the father of fellow footballer Javier Mariona, who has also represented El Salvador internationally.

References

External links
La enorme figura del “Gigante de ébano” Salvador Mariona - El Gráfico 

1943 births
Living people
People from La Libertad Department (El Salvador)
Salvadoran footballers
Association football defenders
Alianza F.C. footballers
El Salvador international footballers
1970 FIFA World Cup players